Jacob K. Shafer (December 26, 1823 – November 22, 1876) was a Delegate from Idaho Territory.

Born near Broadway, Virginia, Shafer was graduated from Washington and Lee University, Lexington, Virginia, in 1843. And from the law school of L.P. Thompson in Staunton, Virginia, in 1846. He moved to Stockton, California in 1849, was admitted to the bar in California and practiced law. He served as district attorney of the fifth judicial district of California in 1850. He served as mayor of Stockton in 1852 and as a judge of the San Joaquin County Court  from 1853 to 1862. In 1862 he moved to what later became Idaho Territory.

Shafer was elected as a Democrat to the Forty-first Congress (March 4, 1869 – March 3, 1871), but was an unsuccessful candidate for renomination. He resumed the practice of law, then later he moved to Eureka, Nevada, where he died November 22, 1876. He was interred in the Masonic Cemetery.

Sources

External links 
 

1823 births
1876 deaths
Mayors of Stockton, California
California state court judges
Delegates to the United States House of Representatives from Idaho Territory
Idaho Democrats
19th-century American politicians
People from Eureka, Nevada
People from Broadway, Virginia
19th-century American judges
19th-century American lawyers